"Baggy Trousers" is a song by English ska/pop band Madness from their 1980 album Absolutely. It was written by lead singer Graham "Suggs" McPherson and guitarist Chris Foreman, and reminisces about school days. (Mike Barson also received a writing credit in error, the correct McPherson/Foreman credit being used for subsequent releases). The band first began performing the song at live shows in April 1980.

It was released as a single on 5 September 1980 and spent 20 weeks in UK charts, reaching a high of #3.  It was the 28th best-selling single of 1980 in the UK.

In October 2017, American punk rock/hip hop band the Transplants released a cover version of the song on their Take Cover EP.

Music and lyrics

Suggs later recalled in an interview that "I was very specifically trying to write a song in the style of Ian Dury, especially the songs he was writing then, which [were] often sort of catalogues of phrases in a constant stream." He contrasted "Baggy Trousers" with Pink Floyd's hit Another Brick in the Wall: "I was writing about my time at school. Pink Floyd had that big hit with 'teacher, leave those kids alone'. It didn't really relate to me, because I hadn't been to a public school where I was bossed about and told to sing 'Rule Britannia!' and all that", having instead attended a comprehensive school with much less strictly enforced discipline.

Music video

The music video of the song was shot in Kentish Town in north west London: at the Kentish Town C of E primary school on Islip Street and the Peckwater Estate.  The band's saxophone player, Lee Thompson decided he wanted to fly through the air for his solo, with the use of wires hanging from a crane. This was inspired by seeing Peter Gabriel flying during a Genesis concert. Thompson recreated the moment live at the band's reunion concert in 1992, Madstock!, during the band's 2007 Christmas tour, and the 2009 Glastonbury Festival as well as in a 2011 TV advert for Kronenbourg 1664 in which the band plays a slow version of "Baggy Trousers". The slow version was later released on the box set A Guided Tour of Madness under the title "Le Grand Pantalon".

The video received great positive response from the public,  and was particularly important as it demonstrated the potential for television shows such as Top of the Pops to show a band's music videos instead of having them perform live.  Following the release of "Baggy Trousers", the public began to anticipate future Madness music videos.

Appearances
In addition to its single release and appearance on the album Absolutely, "Baggy Trousers" also appears on the Madness collections Divine Madness (a.k.a. The Heavy Heavy Hits), Complete Madness, It's... Madness, Total Madness, The Business and  Our House: the Best of Madness. Its only appearance on a US Madness compilation is on Ultimate Collection.

The song was featured in the 2001 film Mean Machine, and was included in the accompanying soundtrack.

In 2011, the song was slowed down to half its normal speed and was used for an advert for the Kronenbourg 1664 'Slow' campaign (see above).

In 1983, Colgate used the song's melody in a television advertisement written by Jay Pond-Jones and Ric Cooper in which a group of kids including actor Lee Ross sing newly written lyrics about Colgate Blue Minty Gel toothpaste, a variant of which was later used in the United States. The advert was seen as groundbreaking but had to be pre-approved by the band. Pond-Jones said, "Many years later ... I found out how they actually quite liked it. Even now, Carl from the band introduces me to people as “the bloke who did the Colgate ad”."

Track listing

7"

12" (Record Store Day 2022)

Charts

Weekly charts

Year-end charts

Certifications and sales

References

External links

1980 singles
Madness (band) songs
Songs written by Suggs (singer)
Songs written by Mike Barson
Songs written by Chris Foreman
Songs about school
Songs about nostalgia
1980 songs
Stiff Records singles
Song recordings produced by Clive Langer
Song recordings produced by Alan Winstanley